CCFI may refer to:

 China Containerized Freight Index (also known as Chinese Containerized Freight Index or Shanghai Containerised Freight Index), a type of economic transport shipping index. See Container Freight Swap Agreement
 Chambre de Commerce France-Israel (English: France-Israel Chamber of Commerce), see Paris Île-de-France Regional Chamber of Commerce and Industry
 Christ's Church Fleming Island, see Christ's Church, Jacksonville, Florida